Cloverdale is an unincorporated community in Dallas County, in the U.S. state of Missouri.

History
A post office called Cloverdale was established in 1896, and remained in operation until 1911. The name Cloverdale is descriptive.

References

Unincorporated communities in Dallas County, Missouri
Unincorporated communities in Missouri